Margaret Reynolds  (born 19 July 1941) served as an Australian Labor Party Senator for Queensland from 1983 to 1999.

Reynolds had two ministerial appointments during her time in the Senate, serving as  Minister for Local Government from September 1987 to April 1990 and as Minister assisting the Prime Minister for the Status of Women from January 1988 to April 1990.

She retired from federal politics in 1999, and went on to lecture in politics and international relations at the University of Queensland. In 1995, Reynolds published a book titled The Last Bastion: Labor women working towards equality in the parliaments of Australia, which is a compilation of biographical details about ALP women from the Party's inception till the year it was published. A further book, Living Politics, was published by University of Queensland Press in 2007.

Early life and teaching career
Reynolds was born on 19 July 1941 in Hobart, Tasmania. She was the only child of Jess (née Montgomery) and Walter Rodis "Rod" Lyne. Her father was a farm labourer and soldier who served in New Guinea during World War II. He died in 1947, after which she and her mother relocated to Launceston to be closer to her maternal grandparents. Both her mother and maternal grandmother were schoolteachers.

Reynolds attended Trevallyn Primary School and Launceston State High School, matriculating in 1957. She subsequently studied teaching for two years at the University of Tasmania. Her first teaching post was at the small rural locality of Natone in the state's north-west. She subsequently undertook further training in special education and taught at schools in Launceston, Devonport, and the Derwent Valley. Reynolds and her husband moved to England in 1964 and spent a year teaching at schools in London's East End. They returned to Australia in mid-1965 and settled in Townsville, Queensland, where her husband became a lecturer at Townsville University College. In Townsville, Reynolds taught for periods at Cootharinga, a special needs school, and at Aitkenvale State School. She completed a diploma in education at James Cook University in 1977 and was appointed as a tutor in language and literature at the local College of Advanced Education. She subsequently completed the degree of Bachelor of Arts at the University of Queensland in 1982.

Early political involvement
In 1966, Reynolds joined the One People of Australia League (OPAL), becoming secretary of the Townsville branch. She helped establish an OPAL kindergarten for Aboriginal and Torres Strait Islander children, working with Indigenous activists Bobbi Sykes and Eddie Mabo. She and Sykes were expelled from OPAL in 1967 for their perceived radicalism. During the Australia's involvement in the Vietnam War, Reynolds helped establish a branch of the anti-conscription organisation Save Our Sons and was active in the Townsville Peace Committee. She was also a founding member of the Townsville branch of the Women's Electoral Lobby and served as its publicity officer.

Reynolds joined the ALP in 1971 and unsuccessfully sought preselection for a state parliament seat in 1976. She was elected to the Townsville City Council in 1979 and served for four years until her election to the Senate. She also served on the ALP state council from 1981 to 1983 and was a campaign director for federal elections. In 1982 she became a full-time organiser for the party in North Queensland.

Personal life
Reynolds had three children with her husband Henry Reynolds, whom she married in 1963. Their daughter Anna was elected Lord Mayor of Hobart in 2018.

Honours and recognition 
Reynolds was appointed a Companion of the Order of Australia (AC) in the 2023 Australia Day Honours for "eminent service to the people and Parliament of Australia, to social justice, gender equality and Indigenous rights, to local government, and to the community".

References

 

In December 2016, Margaret Reynolds became the founding President of ABC Friends National Inc., the co-ordinating body of the various state/territory Friends groups around Australia.

1941 births
Living people
Companions of the Order of Australia
Australian Labor Party members of the Parliament of Australia
Members of the Australian Senate
Members of the Australian Senate for Queensland
Women members of the Australian Senate
James Cook University alumni
Women government ministers of Australia
20th-century Australian politicians
20th-century Australian women politicians